Aster is a  of the Belgian Naval Component, launched on 16 December 1985 at the Mercantile-Belyard shipyard in Rupelmonde and christened by Queen Paola of Belgium. The patronage of Aster was accepted by the city of Blankenberge. Aster was the first of the Belgian Tripartite-class minehunters.

On 11 October 2007, Aster was damaged when the minesweeper collided with a fuel lighter on the River Scheldt.

In early October 2018, it was reported that the Pakistan Navy had received a decommissioned MCMV from Belgium. Jane's in its article, speculated that this could be Aster decommissioned by the Belgian Navy. Further, since the details were not provided by the parties involved, it was not clear whether the Pakistan Navy will operate it or use it as spares.

References 

Tripartite-class minehunters of the Belgian Navy
Ships built in Belgium
Ships built in France
Ships built in the Netherlands
1985 ships
Minehunters of Belgium